Celinde Schoenmaker (born 15 January 1989) is a Dutch actress and singer.

She is known for appearing as Renate Blauel in Rocketman, Fantine in the West End production of the musical Les Misérables, and Christine Daae in the West End production of The Phantom of the Opera during their 30th anniversary.

Early life and education
Schoenmaker lived during her childhood in Dordrecht, Papendrecht, Etten-Leur, and Miami, Florida.

After obtaining her high school diploma, at Stedelijk Gymnasium Breda, Schoenmaker studied Liberal Arts for a year at Oxford Brookes University. Once back in the Netherlands, she was admitted to the Fontys Academy of Arts in Tilburg.

In April 2012 she completed the music course summa cum laude. In June of that year she was awarded the Jacques de Leeuw Prize, as the most talented student of executive education in the Netherlands. This award is designed to give young, talented artists the opportunity to develop themselves.

Career
Theatre

She moved to London after being cast in the role of Fantine in the West End production of Les Misérables. On 14 January 2013 she replaced Sierra Boggess in the role, making her West End debut. On 7 September 2015, Schoenmaker returned to West End in Andrew Lloyd Webber's The Phantom of the Opera as the female lead of Christine Daaé. On 27 September 2016, Schoenmaker performed with Ben Forster in the show's 30th Anniversary performance. Schoenmaker was cast as Jenny Lind in the 2017 Off-West End production of Barnum, which opened on 5 December.

In 2019 Celinde took on the role of Franca in Light in the Piazza, she played the role in London and LA Opera In 2020 Celinde performed the two hander Marry Me A Little

Film / TV 

In 2019, she appeared as Renate Blauel in the Elton John biopic Rocketman. In 2020 she took on the role of Vanessa in the TV series Red Light. In 2021 she played the role of Maaike van de Berg in Hong Kong Lovestory. In 2021 she played the role of Saskia in Our House

Busking 

In 2016, she astonished shoppers in Covent Garden by supporting a local busker (Steven Barry) by singing "All I Ask of You" with him.

Filmography
Rocketman - Renate Blauel
Hong Kong Lovestory - Maaike van de Berg
Red Light - Vanessa
Our House - Saskia

External links

References

1989 births
Living people
Dutch women singers
Dutch musical theatre actresses
People from Dordrecht